Thomas Fortescue (1 May 1744 – 10 December 1779) was an Irish Member of Parliament.

He represented Trim in the Irish House of Commons from 1768 to his death.

He was son of Chichester Fortescue by his wife Elizabeth, daughter of Richard Wesley, 1st Baron Mornington. His son Chichester also served as an MP.

References
 
 http://thepeerage.com/p20601.htm#i206003

1744 births
1779 deaths
Irish MPs 1769–1776
Irish MPs 1776–1783
Thomas
Members of the Parliament of Ireland (pre-1801) for County Meath constituencies